Tummas Eli Hansen (born 11 February 1966) is a retired Faroese football defender.

References

1966 births
Living people
Faroese footballers
B36 Tórshavn players
Association football defenders
Faroe Islands international footballers